Englefield Green Rovers F.C. was a football club based in Englefield Green, near Egham, England. They were members of the Surrey FA.

History

Englefield Green Rovers were founded in 1927. They won the Windsor, Slough & District League Division 3 in the 1984–85 season, and joined the Chiltonian League Division One in 1996, becoming members of Hellenic Football League Division One East when the two leagues merged in 2000. They left the Hellenic League in 2009, and did not play in the 2009–10 season.

Ground
The club played at Coopers Hill Lane in Englefield Green., until their lease was terminated and local boys' club Manorcroft United FC moved in instead.

Colours
Englefield's home colours were green and white shirts, with white shorts and green socks.

Records
Highest placing: Third in Hellenic Football League Division One East
Record gate: 100 v Eton Wick in 1999

References

Defunct football clubs in Surrey
Association football clubs established in 1927
1927 establishments in England
Association football clubs disestablished in 2009
2009 disestablishments in England
Defunct football clubs in England